Adishi (Adysh, Hadysh) is a highland village, 2,040 metres above sea level, in the Mestia Municipality of Samegrelo-Zemo Svaneti region of Georgia. According to the data of 2014, 44 people live in the village. Village is 27 kilometres from the town of Mestia.

History 

The landscape of the village is dominated by a number of medieval monuments, and the Greater Caucasus mountains. The important cultural sites of Adishi are: the Church of the Deliverer (10th–11th centuries), two churches of St George (12th century), the Church of the Archangel (12th century) and several typical Svanetian towers.

The well-known Adysh Gospels (AD 897) was preserved here for centuries.

See also
 Samegrelo-Zemo Svaneti

References 

Churches in Georgia (country)
Populated places in Samegrelo-Zemo Svaneti
Populated places in Mestia Municipality